Coleophora neglecta is a moth of the family Coleophoridae. It is found on the Canary Islands (Fuerteventura) and Algeria.

References

neglecta
Moths described in 1997
Moths of Africa